The People's Action Party "Hope" was founded on 18 March 2005, and has a presence in 27 regions and 525 districts of Ukraine. It is headed by Sergei Selifontiev, who created the "light parliamentary movement" in contrast to what he felt was a shady parliament of the day. On the day of its inception, 1,200,000 citizens of Ukraine joined the party.

References

2005 establishments in Ukraine
Political parties established in 2005
Political parties in Ukraine